Nebojša Zorkić (born 21 August 1961) is a former Serbian basketball player.

National team career 
Zorkić competed for Yugoslavia in the 1984 Summer Olympics.

References

1961 births
Living people
Basketball players at the 1984 Summer Olympics
Competitors at the 1983 Mediterranean Games
KK IMT Beograd players
KK Partizan players
Medalists at the 1984 Summer Olympics
Mediterranean Games gold medalists for Yugoslavia
OKK Beograd players
Olympic basketball players of Yugoslavia
Olympic bronze medalists for Yugoslavia
Olympic medalists in basketball
Serbian expatriate basketball people in Croatia
Serbian expatriate basketball people in Switzerland
Serbian men's basketball players
Yugoslav men's basketball players
Mediterranean Games medalists in basketball
Point guards